Christel Bernhard Julius Hamann (born February 27, 1847 in Hammelwarden, Oldenburg – died June 9, 1948 in Berlin, Germany) was a German-born inventor of Computing Machines.

Early life and education 
Hamann's father was an Oldenburg border guard and ambassador in Ellwitz. Hamann completed an apprenticeship as a mechanic at the Nautical Institute in Bremerhaven and visited the pilot school there. Afterwards he attended the mathematical-mechanical institute of A. Ott in Kempten (Allgäu) in the workshops of Carl Zeiss in Jena and in the workshop of Carl Bamberg in Berlin.

Career 
In 1896 he founded the Mathematical-Mechanical Institute in Berlin-Friedenau, where he developed and built mathematical instruments and surveying instruments. In 1900, he received the gold medal for his instruments at the World Exposition in Paris. Around 1889 he developed the calculation machines Gauss and Berolina inspired in part by the Gauss computing machine of Gottfried Wilhelm Leibniz and the stepped reckoner drum.

In 1907, his institute was taken over by Mercedes Büromaschinen in Berlin. There, he designed the Mercedes Euklid computing machine with the Proportional Lever principle developed by Hamann. He also improved machines for accounting.

In 1909 he built a difference engine.

From 1922 he worked for Deutsche Telephonwerke und Kabelindustrie in Berlin (DeTeWe). From 1925 onwards, he developed the shifting system as a propulsion system for computing machines.  As chief designer, Christel Hamann and his colleague Heinrich Wilhelm created the essential foundations for the DeTeWe computing machines built as far back as the 1960s, Before the electronics displaced the electromechanics.

In 1933 he became an honorary doctor at the TH Berlin.

He was married to Hedwig Schindler (1872–1949) but had no children.

References 
 Rolf Stümpel (Editor): Büromaschinen from Berlin, Museum of Transport and Technology, Berlin 1988
 Hartmut Petzold, Modern composer. The Industrialization of Computing Technology in Germany, CH Beck 1992
 Petzold Computing Machine, VDI Verlag 1985
 Ulf Hashagen, The computing machine Gauss – a failed innovation? , In U. Hashagen, O. Blumritt, H. Trischler (Editor) Circa 1903: Scientific and technical artefacts in the founding period of the German Museum, Munich, 2003, pp. 371–98
 Werner Lange, The work of Christel Hamann, The Büromaschinen-Mechaniker, Issue 11, May 18, 1960, pp. 83–85
 Werner Lange, A brief look into the Hamann calculation machines, the office machine mechanic, issue 19, 1960, p. 245–46, issue 23, 1961, p. 65–66, issue 27, 1961, p. 168–69, issue 68, 1964, p. 186–88
 Werner Lange An interesting outsider: Hamann computing machines, the office machine mechanic, issue 127, 1969, p. 66 – 67
 Heinz Nix's profile: Hamann, Christel Bernhard Julius.In: New German Biography (NDB). Vol. 7, Duncker & Humblot, Berlin 1966, p. 573 (digitalisat).
 Reese, Martin: Personal: The Unknown Chr. Hamann. In: Historische WBürowelt, No. 97 (Sept. 2014), pp. 11–18. See IFHB.

External links 
 Article Hamann in Rechnerlexikon
 The computing machines of Christel Hamann
 Erhard Anthes: The last Hamann machine, model 600
 Weiss, the calculating machine Gauss, original and model (pdf)

20th-century German inventors
German centenarians
Men centenarians
1847 births
1948 deaths
People from Lower Saxony